Rostellariidae is a family of sea snails, marine gastropod molluscs in the clade Littorinimorpha.

Taxonomy

Higher classification
Bouchet & Rocroi (2005)
This taxon is ranked at subfamily level Rostellariinae within the family Strombidae in the taxonomy of the Gastropoda (Bouchet & Rocroi, 2005).  Above this rank the superfamily Caenogastropoda contains the unranked clades Hypsogastropoda and Littorinimorpha respectively.

Morrison (2008)
Rostellariidae is ranked at family level for example by Morrison (2008).

Genera
The family consists of the following genera:
 † Africoterebellum Eames, 1957 
 † Amekichilus Eames, 1957 
 † Amplogladius Cossmann, 1889 
 † Calyptraphorus Conrad, 1857 
 † Cyclomolops Gabb, 1868 
 † Cyrtulotibia Eames, 1957 
 † Dientomochilus Cossmann, 1904 
 † Digitolabrum Cossmann, 1904 
 † Ectinochilus Cossmann, 1889 
 † Eotibia B. L. Clark, 1942 
 † Mauryna de Gregorio, 1880 
 † Rimella Agassiz, 1841
 Rimellopsis Lambiotte, 1979
 Rostellariella Thiele, 1929
 Strombolaria de Gregorio, 1880 
 † Sulcogladius Sacco, 1893 
 † Terebellomimus Pacaud, 2008 
 † Terebellopsis Leymerie, 1846 
 Tibia Röding, 1798 (synonyms: Gladius Mörch, 1852; Rostellaria Lamarck, 1799; Rostellum Montfort, 1810)
 Varicospira Eames, 1952

References

 Stewart, R. B. (1927). Gabb's California fossil type gastropods. Proceedings of the Academy of Natural Sciences of Philadelphia. 78: 287–447, pls. 20–32.
 Bandel K. (2007) About the larval shell of some Stromboidea, connected to a review of the classification and phylogeny of the Strombimorpha (Caenogastropoda). Freiberger Forschungshefte, ser. C 524: 97-206.
 Kronenberg G.C. & Burger A.W. (2002) On the subdivision of Recent Tibia-like gastropods (Gastropoda, Stromboidea), with the recognition of the family Rostellariidae Gabb, 1868, and a note on the type species of Tibia Röding, 1798. Vita Malacologica 1: 39-48

External links
 Bouchet, P., Rocroi, J.-P. (2005). Classification and nomenclator of gastropod families. Malacologia. 47(1-2): 1–397. .

 
Stromboidea